was a Japanese academic, art historian, Botticelli scholar  and Director of the Institute for Art Research in Tokyo.

Biography
In 1960, he became the founding director of the Museum of Japanese Art (Yamato Bunkakan) in Nara, Nara.  This museum of Asian art was established to preserve and display the private collection of the Kintetsu Corporation (Kinki Nippon Railway Co., Ltd.).

Honors
 Charles Lang Freer Medal, September 15, 1965.

Selected works
In a statistical overview derived from writings by and about Yukio Yashiro, OCLC/WorldCat encompasses roughly 100+ works in 100+ publications in 7 languages and in 1,000+ library holdings.

The most widely held works by Yashiro include:

 2000 years of Japanese Art; 5 editions published in 1958 in English and held by 680 libraries worldwide
 Sandro Botticelli and the Florentine Renaissance; 4 editions published in 1929 in English and held by 197 libraries worldwide
 Art treasures of Japan; 1 edition published in 1960 in English and held by 168 libraries worldwide
 Sandro Botticelli; 2 editions published in 1925 in English and held by 138 libraries worldwide
 日本美術の特質 by 矢代幸雄; 8 editions published between 1943 and 1965 in Japanese and held by 41 libraries worldwide
 The Avery Brundage Collection of Asian Art: M. H. de Young Memorial Museum, San Francisco; 1 edition published in 1966 in English and held by 26 libraries worldwide
 Japanische Kunst; 4 editions published in 1958 in German and held by 22 libraries worldwide
 水墨画 by 矢代幸雄; 5 editions published between 1969 and 1977 in Japanese and held by 20 libraries worldwide
 東洋美術論考; 3 editions published in 1942 in Japanese and held by 20 libraries worldwide
 世界に於ける日本美術の位置; 5 editions published between 1935 and 1988 in Japanese and held by 19 libraries worldwide

See also
 Yamato Bunkakan

Notes

References
 Danilov, Victor J. (1992). A Planning Guide for Corporate Museums, Galleries, and Visitor Centers. New York: Greenwood Press. ; 
 Freer Gallery of Art. (1965). Third presentation of the Charles Lang Freer medal, September 15, 1965. Washington, D.C.: Smithsonian Institution.
 Martin, John H, and Phyllis G Martin. (1993). Nara: a Cultural Guide to Japan's Ancient Capital. Tokyo: Charles E. Tuttle. ;

External links
 
 Yashiro and Berenson: Art History between Japan and Italy - online exhibition

1890 births
1975 deaths
Japanese curators
Japanese art historians
Sandro Botticelli